La Plagne Tarentaise is a commune in the Savoie department of southeastern France. The municipality was established on 1 January 2016 and consists of the former communes of Bellentre, La Côte-d'Aime, Mâcot-la-Plagne and Valezan.

See also 
Communes of the Savoie department

References 

Communes of Savoie